Rehob (Ammonite: 𐤓𐤇𐤁, representing) was the father of Baasha of Ammon, who was king of Ammon in the 850s BCE. Whether Rehob himself was king of Ammon is unclear, as no Ammonite inscriptions from his reign have been unearthed and he is not mentioned independently in any Assyrian sources. On the Kurkh Monolith, Ammon may be named Bīt-Ruḫubi, or the "House of Rehob".

Kings of Ammon
9th-century BC rulers
9th-century BC people